Głuchowo may refer to the following places:
Głuchowo, Kościan County in Greater Poland Voivodeship (west-central Poland)
Głuchowo, Kuyavian-Pomeranian Voivodeship (north-central Poland)
Głuchowo, Masovian Voivodeship (east-central Poland)
Głuchowo, Poznań County in Greater Poland Voivodeship (west-central Poland)
Głuchowo, Szamotuły County in Greater Poland Voivodeship (west-central Poland)
Głuchowo, Lubusz Voivodeship (west Poland)